Nagliyatchi VC is an Azerbaijani women's volleyball club from Baku.

History

Team 2009-2010
As of December 2009

Honours

References

External links
Volleyball in Azerbaijan

Azerbaijani volleyball clubs
Volleyball clubs established in 2005
2005 establishments in Azerbaijan
Sports teams in Baku